Paracanthocinus laosensis is a species of beetle in the family Cerambycidae, and the only species in the genus Paracanthocinus. It was described by Stephan von Breuning in 1965.

References

Acanthocinini
Beetles described in 1965
Monotypic beetle genera